The 2015 Real Salt Lake Women season is the team's fourth year of existence in its current incarnation and their ninth consecutive season in the Women's Premier Soccer League, the second division of the American soccer pyramid.

Competitions

Preseason

WPSL regular season

Standings

Big Sky Conference Table

Results summary

Results by round

Match results

Club

Roster
As of June 14, 2015.

References

Women's Premier Soccer League seasons
2015
2015 in sports in Utah
American soccer clubs 2015 season